Moh Youn Sook (March 5, 1910 – June 7, 1990; Korean: 모윤숙) is a well known Korean female poet.

Life
While young she belonged to a circle of friends which also included the alleged secret agent Kim Soo-im. Though Moh is a focus of great popular admiration and critical inquiry in the Korean-speaking world, she and her work are little known abroad.

Moh Youn Sook's pen name was Yeongun. She was born in Wonsan, Hamgyeongnam-do, on March 5, 1910. She attended Hamheung Yeongsaeng Girls' School, Hosudon Girls' School, and graduated from Ewha Technical College, majoring in Literature. She taught at Jiando Myeongsin and Baewha Girls' High schools, and was a reporter for Samcheollisa and Joongang Broadcasting Company. In 1940, she was detained at Gyeonggi-do Police Station for writing the poems "Joseonui ttal" and "I saengmyeong". After Korea gained independence from Japan, she remained active not only in literature but also in various other fields. Moh participated in the 1948 UN General Assembly as a representative of Korea; she also attended the 1954 establishment of the Korean Division of the International Pen Club, consecutively filling various posts. She served as committee chairwoman of the Korean Freedom Literary Association, head committee member of All Literature, committee chairwoman of Korean Division of International Pen Club, committee vice-chairwoman for the International Pen Club, and president of Korea's Contemporary Poetry Association.  She died on June 7, 1990.

Work
Her early poetry, often criticized for indulging in facile emotionalism and sentimentalism, is marked by sharp depictions of repressed passion in direct and vivid images. Her work, however, while certainly bold, energetic, and occasionally overflowing, is not always addressed to a single beloved figure; the object of her free outpour of emotions is often the Korean nation. Her intense and often frustrated patriotism ramifies into the issues of history, national territory, nature, and provincial affairs. In 1940, Moh was still deeply involved in publications and writing, but like many of her contemporaries, she was forced to tailor her works to the political policies of the Japanese. Under oppressive colonial rule, she gradually turned to writing 'pure poetry' a poetry of pure, disembodied lyricism, containing no political, social, or historical references whatsoever. After the Liberation, however, she once again gave free rein to her patriotic impulses and composed highly inspiring patriotic pieces celebrating the prevailing nationalistic consciousness of the period.

Works in Translation
 Wren's Elegy, prose, The Pagoda, an epic & Other Poems (렌의 애가)

Works in Korean (partial)
Poetry Collections
 Binnaneun Jiyeok
 Okbinyeo
 Pungnang,
 Jeonggyeong
 Pungto
 Nongae
 Mo Yunsuk Sijeonjip,
 Gukguneun jugeoseo malhanda

Awards
 National Outstanding Citizen's Award
 Arts Award
 March 1 Independence Literary Award

References 

1910 births
1990 deaths
Korean women poets
20th-century Korean poets
20th-century South Korean women writers
Mo clan of Guangzhou